Jean Battlo is an American playwright from West Virginia. She is known for writing plays on Appalachian themes and history, which have been performed in several states.



Life and career
Battlo was born and raised in Kimball, in McDowell County, West Virginia. Her parents were Italian immigrants who moved to West Virginia to work in the coal mines. After attending Welch High School in Welch, Battlo earned a B.A. and an M.A. at Marshall University where she studied history, drama, and literature, and minored in philosophy. Battlo has also completed 35 hours of classical studies at William and Mary. She launched her writing career by publishing two volumes of poetry, Bonsai and Modern Haiku.

At the request of a local theatre group, Battlo wrote her first plays, A Highly Successful West Virginia Business and Caves. The group turned to Battlo, whose poetry had established her as a writer, for new plays because they could not afford the royalties for most established playwrights. Her West Virginia plays attempt to dispel widely held stereotypes of Appalachian people and West Virginians. Battlo said, "These people are not caricatures, not ‘mammy Yokums, not hillbilly stereotypes. These are people I live with. They’re real. They watch CNN. They know what’s going on in the world. They just haven’t lost touch with their roots." From 1987–1989, Battlo served as Writer-in-Residence for Theatre West Virginia, in Beckley, where she continues to teach playwriting workshops.

Many of Battlo's plays focus on historical themes. #8 tells the story of a Jewish family shortly before the Holocaust. Between Two Worlds was written to celebrate the centennial of West Virginia author Pearl S. Buck's birth. The play The House on Second Street is about the Lizzie Borden murders. With help from a West Virginia Humanities Council seed grant, Battlo researched the 1921 murder of "Smilin'" Sid Hatfield, which became the basis for the 2000 play The Terror of the Tug. The Terror of the Tug is performed every summer by McArts, the McDowell County community arts organization, which Battlo founded and directs.

Battlo established the Globe Stage in McDowell County, which is a replica of Shakespeare's Globe Theatre.

Battlor is also the founder of Coal Camp Creations, under the auspices of McArts. Coal Camp Creations brings together West Virginia artists and craftspeople to produce artistic statues out of coal mined in McDowell County.

Critical response and awards
Scenes from Battlo's plays Frog Songs and Shakespeare: Love in Series were included in Linda Pinnell's textbook Getting Started in Theater.

The House on Second Street was a finalist in the 1998 Forest-Shiras Competition. The play #8 was a finalist for Camel-Sea and a finalist for the Eugene O'Neill National Playwright's Competition in 1990, and was optioned by Off-Broadway Stage Arts.

Her plays have been performed throughout Appalachia. Companies that have staged Battlo's works include: the Tennessee Stage Company, the Southern Appalachian Repertory Theater in North Carolina, and Theater West Virginia and the Charleston Stage Company, both in West Virginia.

Battlo won awards in 1997 and 1998 for her earliest books of poetry, Bonsai and Modern Haiku.

Published works

Plays
 #8
 Caves
 Frog Songs
 A Highly Successful West Virginia Business
 The House on Second Street
 The Little Theater's Production of "Hamlet"
 The Morning Glory Tree
 Of Freckled Human Nature
 Shakespeare: Love in Series, co-authored with Alma Bennett
 The Terror of the Tug
 Voltaire's Confession

Other published works
 Bonsai
 Modern Haiku
 Pictorial History of McDowell County
 The Mahotep Synod
 Appalachian Gothic Tales
 McDowell County in West Virginia and American History
 Behold the Man

References

American women dramatists and playwrights
Writers from West Virginia
20th-century American dramatists and playwrights
21st-century American dramatists and playwrights
People from Kimball, West Virginia
Living people
21st-century American women writers
20th-century American women writers
Year of birth missing (living people)